Super Series (2022) was a professional wrestling supercard event produced by Major League Wrestling (MLW), in conjunction with Lucha Libre AAA Worldwide (AAA) and Dragon Gate. It took place on September 18, 2022 at the Space Events Center in Norcross, Georgia. It was the second event in the MLW Super Series chronology, following AAA vs MLW in 2020, and served as a television taping for MLW Fusion.

Production

Background
MLW.com revealed on January 2, 2021 that discussions were being had to promote a second Super Series event. Over a year later on July 19, 2022, MLW.com revealed plans to hold a 2022 Super Series event with other promotions. On July 22, 2022, the event was officially announced to be taking place on September 18, with MLW making its Atlanta metropolitan area debut at the Space Event Center in Norcross, Georgia. Promotions participating in the event include Lucha Libre AAA Worldwide (AAA) and Dragon Gate

Storylines
The show featured several professional wrestling matches that resulted from scripted storylines, where wrestlers portray villains, heroes, or less distinguishable characters in the scripted events that build tension and culminate in a wrestling match or series of matches.

Several talent from MLW's partners, as well as free agents via MLW's "Open Door" Policy, made appearances at the event, including Dragon Gate's SB Kento, and free agent Willie Mack.

At Battle Riot IV, MLW World Heavyweight Champion Alexander Hammerstone was originally supposed to defend the title against Bandido, but an injury sustained by the latter at Triplemanía XXX: Tijuana forced Bandido to withdraw. Hammerstone would retain his title against Richard Holliday in a falls count anywhere match at the event. On August 8, MLW announced that Bandido will get his title match with Hammerstone at Super Series.

On August 16, MLW announced that Dragon Gate's Shun Skywalker would take part at the Super Series. On August 30, Skywalker released a video calling out MLW World Middleweight Champion Myron Reed. Two days later, Reed released a response accepting the challenge, and a match for the title was made official for the event.

Results

References

Major League Wrestling shows
2022 in professional wrestling
August 2022 events in the United States
Professional wrestling in Atlanta
2022 American television episodes
2020s American television specials
Events in Atlanta
Lucha Libre AAA Worldwide shows
Dragon Gate (wrestling)